Copenhaver was an unincorporated community in Kanawha County, West Virginia, United States. Its post office  is closed.

The community was named after the local Copenhaver family.

References 

Unincorporated communities in West Virginia
Unincorporated communities in Kanawha County, West Virginia